Thomas More (1478–1535) was a saint, martyr and author; Lord Chancellor of England during the reign of Henry VIII.

Thomas More may also refer to:

People
 Thomas More (died 1421), MP for Gloucester
 Thomas More (died 1461), MP for Cumberland
 Thomas More (died 1606) (1531–1606), English politician
 Thomas More (weaver), 17th-century lay theologian

Entertainment
 Thomas More (The Tudors), a character from the television series
 Sir Thomas More (play), an Elizabethan play

Art
 Portrait of Sir Thomas More (Holbein), 1527 painting by Hans Holbein the Younger
 Thomas More, Lord High Chancellor of England, 1828 painting by Claudius Jacquand

Institutions

See also
 Thomas Moore (disambiguation)

More, Thomas